Slappy is the second EP by American rock band Green Day. It was released in 1990 through Lookout! Records. Upon its release, several different colors of vinyl were available in limited quantities. Billie Joe Armstrong cited the extended play as the one on which Green Day began to find its sound.

Liner notes
Recorded in a few hours on April 20, 1990, at Art of Ears Studio with Andro Engineering and mixed April 23 in a few more hours. Produced by Andro and Green Day. Mastered by John Golden at K-Disc, Hollywood. Front cover photo by Al Sobrante, back Sean Hughes Layout and "Green Day Bitz" by Aaron Cometbus. Green Day's 39/Smooth L.P. and 1,000 Hours E.P. were also available on Lookout.

Album information
"Paper Lanterns" was a popular Green Day song and a live staple for many years and was brought back for the 2010 leg of the 21st Century Breakdown World Tour. "Why Do You Want Him?" was the first song Armstrong wrote, back when he was fourteen. He expressed in a 2010 interview that contrary to the common belief, the song is not about his stepfather. The title "409 in Your Coffeemaker" is taken from a prank Armstrong pulled on his teacher. The prank was that he put some Clorox cleaner in his teacher’s coffeemaker, and it was known as Formula 409, hence the name of the song. It was later re-recorded during the Dookie sessions, and was released as a B-Side on the "Basket Case" CD single in the United Kingdom. "Knowledge" was originally performed by Operation Ivy for their 1989 album Energy. Green Day still performs the song live, often inviting fans onstage to play the band members' instruments for them during the performance of the song.

All four tracks from Slappy were included on the compilation album 1,039/Smoothed Out Slappy Hours in 1991. Slappy remained in print until August 2005, when Green Day removed its catalog from Lookout! Records.

Since March 24, 2009, Slappy (along with 1,000 Hours) has been back in print as a bonus to the vinyl reissue of the 39/Smooth album. However, a possible error may have been made as Slappy's artwork is now tinted pink instead of dark red.

Track listing

Personnel
 Billie Joe Armstrong — lead vocals, guitar
 Mike Dirnt — bass, backing vocals
 John Kiffmeyer — drums
 Aaron Cometbus — backing vocals, "teeth" on "Knowledge"

Notes
 The dog on the cover of Slappy was known as Mickey. "Slappy" was a nickname given to him by Mike Dirnt's friend Jason Relva (the subject of Green Day's later song J.A.R.).
 "Why Do You Want Him?" was reportedly written by Armstrong when he was 14 years old and was the first song he wrote.
 "409 in Your Coffeemaker" was re-recorded for the group's third studio album Dookie in 1994. However, the band declined having it put on the record. The Dookie recording of the song can still be found in "unmixed" form on the U.K. "Basket Case" single. Armstrong has also stated that "409 in Your Coffeemaker" is his favorite song on Slappy.

References

1990 EPs
Green Day EPs
Lookout! Records EPs
Reprise Records EPs
Albums produced by Andy Ernst